Langrick railway station was a station in Langrick, Lincolnshire, England, on the line between Boston and Lincoln.

History
Langrick station opened on 17 October 1848. It closed, along with the Lincolnshire Loop Line on 17 June 1963.

The station had two brick platforms immediately east of the level crossing on Ferry Road. The main building stood at right angles to the platform, with the booking office behind the station masters house which led to a waiting room facing onto the "up" platform. The signal box was sited at the east end of the station.

Accidents and incidents
On 8 March 1937, a passenger train was derailed due to the poor condition of the track.

Site

Langrick Station Cafe now occupies what was the ticket office . The possibility that the building now standing is a much-converted original station office . The building does however stand on the same axis as the original, on Ferry Lane, in Langrick.

The Water Rail Way is a Sustrans cycle route (number one) which follows the line of the former Lincoln to Boston railway line, including Langrick.

References

Disused railway stations in Lincolnshire
Former Great Northern Railway stations
Railway stations in Great Britain opened in 1848
Railway stations in Great Britain closed in 1963